Ludwig Ritter von Höhnel (6 August 1857, Preßburg – 23 March 1942, Vienna) was an Austrian naval officer and explorer. He was trained at the naval academy in Fiume, then part of the Austrian empire. His brother was the naturalist Franz Xaver Rudolf von Höhnel (1852–1920).

Journey with Teleki 1887–1888

Höhnel was the second-in-command of Count Sámuel Teleki von Szek's expedition to Northern Kenya in 1887–1888. He and Teleki were the first Europeans to see Lake Turkana, which they named Lake Rudolf after the expedition's patron Crown Prince Rudolf of Austria, and also Lake Stefanie, named after Prince Rudolf's wife Princess Stéphanie of Belgium. Höhnel acted as the expedition's cartographer, scientist, and diarist. Teleki and Höhnel made numerous observations on the climate, flora, and fauna of the territories visited and collected more than 400 ethnographical objects, most of them from Maasai and Kikuyu tribes. Their observations provided important contribution to ethnographical knowledge. The scientific results of the journey were published by Höhnel in several articles and in a book written in German and translated into Hungarian and English, titled The Discovery of Lakes Rudolf and Stefanie (1892). In 1892 Höhnel was awarded the Carl Ritter Medal (silver) "for a first successful pioneering trip and for [his] meritorious geographic performance." The East African chameleon, known as Höhnel's Chameleon (Trioceros hoehnelii) was named after Ludwig von Höhnel.

Journey with Chanler 1892–1894
Between 1892 and 1894, Höhnel explored the territory in the vicinity of Mount Kilimanjaro with American magnate William Astor Chanler. They proceeded inland from the coast, mapping the north-eastern part of the Mount Kenya massif, the Guasso Nyiro River, the Lorian Swamp, the Tana River, Lake Rudolph and then Lake Stefanie. They were the first westerners to come into contact with the Tigania, the Igembe Meru and the Rendille people in this region (Carl Peters had passed to the south in 1889). On 30 January 1893, they were attacked by some 200 warriors of the Wamsara (a subgroup of the Meru), who retreated after killing three porters. The expedition was eventually stranded in what is now the Meru North District of Kenya because of the death of all of its 165 pack animals (probably due to trypanosomiasis) and the desertion of many of the 200 porters. On 24 August 1893, Höhnel was gored by a rhinoceros in the groin and lower abdomen and was forced to leave Chanler and return to Zanzibar and then Vienna, arriving in February 1894. Out of about five hundred photos taken during the journey, 155 photographs taken by Höhnel have survived.

Five specimens donated to the Smithsonian were previously unknown species, including two species of butterflies, two species of reptiles, and Chanler's Mountain Reedbuck.

Later life
After recovering from his injuries, Höhnel became an officer on board the corvette SMS Donau, and traveled in 1897 to the Mediterranean and along the coast of West Africa south to Cameroon, then across the Atlantic to the Caribbean, and to New York and Newport, Rhode Island. During the trip, the ship's captain suffered a heart attack and Höhnel was made provisional commandant until June 1898. Also on this voyage he met the future US president Theodore Roosevelt, who was then in his words the 'much feared' police commissioner of New York. After this, Höhnel was assigned as officer of the deck to the central battery ship , whose executive officer was Commander Anton Haus, the future commander of the Austro-Hungarian Navy.

In 1899 Höhnel became Emperor Franz Joseph's aide-de-camp and later (1905–09) led an official Austro-Hungarian delegation to Emperor Menelik II of Ethiopia. He also commanded the Austro-Hungarian torpedo cruiser  in a voyage to Australia and Polynesia in the summer of 1905. Höhnel was instrumental in introducing the chamois into New Zealand, negotiating the acquisition in 1905 of six does and two bucks from Neuberg in Austria. They finally arrived in New Zealand on board the SMS Turakino in 1907. He was the commanding officer of the armored cruiser  and the commander of the navy yard in Pula.

In February 1907, he submitted a formal request to the navy for permission to marry Valeska von Ostéren (1870–1947) (permission was required as per Austrian naval regulations). However, permission was denied, because it was discovered that Valeska's brother had published an anti-Jesuit novel in 1906 which had offended the powerful Archduke Franz Ferdinand. Höhnel was eventually forced to choose between his marriage and his naval career. He married Valeska in August 1909 and subsequently resigned in the rank of captain. In 1912 he was promoted to rear admiral, probably in recognition of his duties as aide-de-camp to the emperor.

Post-naval career
Höhnel wrote an autobiography centered on the turbulent years preceding the fall of the Austro-Hungarian monarchy, providing insights into African exploration, the Austro-Hungarian Navy, and prominent personalities of the Habsburg court, including Admiral Hermann von Spaun, Admiral Maximilian Daublebsky von Sterneck, and Rudolf Montecuccoli. The complete manuscript remained in the possession of the family of William Astor Chanler for many decades and was finally published in 2000.

Höhnel later wrote a 56-page account of his service as aide-de-camp to the Emperor Franz Joseph I of Austria, which was never published.

He died in Vienna in March 1942, and is buried in the Vienna Central Cemetery.

Legacy
Höhnel is commemorated in the scientific name of a species of chameleon, Trioceros hoehnelii. In 1958 the Ludwig von Höhnel Lane in Vienna was named after him.

Publications
Discovery of lakes Rudolf and Stefanie: a narrative of Count Samuel Teleki's exploring & hunting expedition in Eastern Equatorial Africa in 1887 & 1888, translated by Nancy Bell. In 2 vols. (Longmans, 1896). Original in German: Zum Rudolph-See und Stephanie-See, 1892.
Over Land and Sea: Memoir of an Austrian Rear Admiral's Life in Europe and Africa, 1857–1909, ed. Ronald E. Coons and Pascal James Imperato; consulting ed. J. Winthrop Aldrich. New York and London: Holmes & Meier, 2000. Original in German: Mein Leben zur See, auf Forschungsreisen und bei Hofe, 1926.

Notes

References

Bibliography
 

1857 births
1942 deaths
19th-century Austrian people
20th-century Austrian people
Austro-Hungarian Navy officers
Austrian explorers
Austrian knights
Austrian people of Hungarian descent
Explorers of Africa
Hungarian-German people
Military personnel from Bratislava